Stanięcino  (German Stantin) is a village in the administrative district of Gmina Słupsk, within Słupsk County, Pomeranian Voivodeship, in northern Poland. 

The village has a population of 140.

References

Villages in Słupsk County